Gav Sur (also Romanized as Gāv Sūr; also known as Gausurkh, Gav-e Sorkh, and Gāv Sorkh) is a village in Howmeh-ye Kerend Rural District, in the Central District of Dalahu County, Kermanshah Province, Iran. At the 2006 census, its population was 894, in 183 families.

References 

Populated places in Dalahu County